Hjalmar (Jalmari) Rötkö (13 August 1892, Suomenniemi – 19 July 1938) was a Finnish labourer and politician. He was a member of the Parliament of Finland from 1929 to 1930, representing the Socialist Electoral Organisation of Workers and Smallholders (STPV).

On 5 July 1930, Rötkö and Eino Pekkala were kidnapped by the fascist Lapua Movement.

See also
List of kidnappings

References

1892 births
1938 deaths
Kidnapped politicians
Members of the Parliament of Finland (1929–30)
People from Suomenniemi
People from Viipuri Province (Grand Duchy of Finland)
Socialist Electoral Organisation of Workers and Smallholders politicians